Kentucky Route 105 (KY 105) is an  state highway in Breckinridge County, Kentucky.

Route description
It travels from KY 79 and KY 2201 just west of the unincorporated community of Axtel to U.S. Route 60 Business (US 60 Bus.) in Cloverport.

History
Until 1958, KY 105 also ran a course from Russellville to Axtel via Morgantown and Caneyville. That routing became part of KY 79.

Major intersections

References

0105
Transportation in Breckinridge County, Kentucky
U.S. Route 79